Mauricio de Zúñiga (died 1816) was a Spanish military officer who served as governor of West Florida from 1812 to 1813, and again in 1816.

Early years 
Mauricio de Zúñiga was born in the 18th century, probably in El Prat de Llobregat, in Baix Llobregat (Barcelona Province, Catalonia, Spain). As a youth, he joined the Spanish army, where he rose to the rank of lieutenant colonel.

Political career 
In July 1812, Zúñiga was appointed governor of West Florida, and moved to its capital, Pensacola. He served in that office till April 1813.

In 1814, during the War of 1812, the British Royal Marines established what became known as the Negro Fort on Prospect Bluff along the Spanish side of the Apalachicola River. The garrison initially included around 1,000 Britons and several hundred persons of African descent. Shortly after the end of the war in 1815, the British withdrew from the post and left the black population in occupation. Over the next few years the fort became a colony for escaped slaves from Pensacola, St. Augustine, and Georgia.

After Zúñiga resumed the governorship of West Florida in March 1816, Andrew Jackson, commander of the Southern Military Division of the United States, wrote him and demanded that the Spanish authorities immediately intervene to destroy or remove the denizens of the fort and the surrounding community of escaped slaves and Indians. Although Zúñiga did not have enough troops to deploy and drive them out, he did send Captain Sebastián Pintado to investigate the matter and recover any runaway slaves who belonged to the Spanish.

Zúñiga, who wanted to maintain good relations with the Native Americans of Florida (who would be outraged if the Negro Fort was attacked) and, at the same time, wanted to avoid a military invasion by Jackson, replied that he also was concerned about the fort, but awaited instructions from his superiors what to do about the matter. Soon afterward, however, someone from the fort fired shots at an American supply ship. This gave Jackson the excuse he needed to order the attack and destruction of the fort by General Edmund P. Gaines on July 27. 1816, in which almost all of its residents were killed. Nevertheless, the number of runaway slaves from Georgia who subsequently fled to Florida was still significant.

Zúñiga's term as governor ended on 15 September 1816, and he died near the end of that year.

References

External links 
Fort Gadsden and the "Negro Fort" - Florida.
Fort Gadsden National Historic Site, Apalachicola National Forest.

Governors of West Florida
Spanish colonels
People from El Prat de Llobregat
Royal Governors of La Florida
18th-century births
1816 deaths